Croix de Belledonne, at , is one of the highest points in the Belledonne range in the French Alps, close to the highest summit in the range, Grand Pic de Belledonne at . The name derives from the cross erected on the summit (croix means cross in French ).

Geography 
Located in the department of Isère, Croix of Belledonne is one of the highest summits in the Belledonne range.

History 
The first ascension is estimated to have taken place around 1850.

The gap separating the Croix de Belledonne from the Central Peak is named after the alpinist Henry Duhamel

See also

External links 
 Géologie des Trois Pics de Belledonne

Reference 

Mountains of Isère
Mountains of the Alps
Natural arches of France
Geography of Isère
Alps